Liolaemus huacahuasicus is a species of lizard in the family Iguanidae.
It is endemic to Argentina.

References

huacahuasicus
Lizards of South America
Reptiles of Argentina
Endemic fauna of Argentina
Reptiles described in 1985
Taxa named by Raymond Laurent
Taxonomy articles created by Polbot